Snelsmore Common is a  biological Site of Special Scientific Interest north of Newbury in Berkshire. It is owned by West Berkshire Council and managed by the Berkshire, Buckinghamshire and Oxfordshire Wildlife Trust.

This is a country park which has diverse habitats, including dry heath, wet heath, bog, birch woods and ancient semi-natural broadleaved woodland. The bog has a 5,000 year old layer of peat which has been studied stratigraphically to show changes in ancient land use and vegetation. An area of wet alder woodland has many lichens, including a rich community which grows on trees, such as Parmelia caperarta, Pertusaria pertusa and Lecanactis abietina.

References

 

Berkshire, Buckinghamshire and Oxfordshire Wildlife Trust
Sites of Special Scientific Interest in Berkshire
Parks and open spaces in Berkshire
West Berkshire District